Gabriel Trujillo Soler (born 30 September 1979)  is a Spanish professional tennis player.

ATP tournaments finals

Singles (1 title, 1 runner-up)

References

External links
 
 

Living people
Spanish male tennis players
Tennis players from Barcelona
1979 births